The G3 battlecruisers were a class of battlecruisers planned by the Royal Navy after the end of World War I in response to naval expansion programmes by the United States and Japan. The four ships of this class would have been larger, faster and more heavily armed than any existing battleship (although several projected foreign ships would be larger). The G3s have been considered to be proper "fast battleships" since they were well-balanced designs with adequate protection. Nonetheless the class was officially designated as a "battlecruiser" due to their higher speed and lesser firepower and armour relative to the planned N3-class battleship design. The G3s carried nine  guns and were expected to achieve , while the N3s would carry nine  guns on the same displacement at the expense of a slower speed.

The G3 design was approved by the Board of Admiralty on 12 August 1921. Orders were placed in October, but were suspended in mid-November shortly after the beginning of the Washington Naval Conference which limited battleship sizes. The orders were cancelled in February 1922 with the ratification of the Washington Naval Treaty which limited construction to ships of no more than  displacement.

Background
In 1916 the US had declared its intention to create a Navy "second to none"; the United States Congress had authorized the building of a large number of battleships and battlecruisers. In the aftermath of the First World War, the Japanese government were also embarking on a large programme of warship building. Meanwhile, in Great Britain, the s were followed by the slower and cheaper . Two improved Revenge-class hulls were converted during construction into the two s as emergency builds during the war. The only new capital ships laid down in the war were the s. Their design had been called into question after the Battle of Jutland in 1916. Three of this class were cancelled, leaving only  to be completed to an altered design.

The US plan had been delayed by the wartime need to build smaller vessels. Nevertheless, estimates by the Admiralty were that by the early 1920s the UK would be behind in ships. The British did have access to German technology through ships such as the battleship  which had been saved from the scuttling of the interned German High Seas Fleet in Scapa Flow and the experiences of the war. A committee concluded that any new ship should be able to match the speed of the new US s, expected to make 32 knots. These designs were given letters of the alphabet running backwards from K to G. The related battleship designs under consideration at the same time had design letters from L upwards.

The first two design proposals, 'K2' and 'K3', had a general layout similar to Hood, but were armed with either eight or nine 18-inch guns, in four twin or three triple gun turrets, respectively. The numeral in the designation came from the number of guns in each turret. These ships were very large, displacing , could only reach , and could only be docked in a single ex-German floating dock and one dock, Gladstone Dock, in Liverpool. This reduction in size allowed the ship to dock anywhere that Hood could dock and to pass through the Suez and Panama Canals. 'I3' took another route in saving weight and concentrated the main armament amidships with 'X' turret placed between the forward superstructure and the funnels. The consequent weight savings were negated by additional hull and machinery weights and the ship displaced only slightly less than 'K3'. It had the advantage, however, that it could be docked in Rosyth and Portsmouth and pass through both canals, once the Suez Canal had been deepened. The primary drawback was that the main armament had a blind spot towards the rear of the ship of not less than 40°. Several variations were evaluated of the 'H3' design with the number of turrets reduced. In 'H3a' both turrets were forward of the superstructure while in 'H3b' one was forward and the other was aft of the forward superstructure.

Design and description
The G3s incorporated several novel features for dreadnought-era capital ships, or at least for British designs of this type. Most immediately noticeable was the concentration of the main battery forward of the bridge and engineering spaces, giving the ships a tanker-like appearance. Since the G3s were to use existing dockyard facilities, this layout allowed designers to keep the length of the ships, as well as the weight of armour, to a minimum. The resulting loss of heavy fire astern was considered justifiable since the ships were intended to fight on the broadside. A related feature of the G3 and N3 designs was their tower bridge structure behind the first two gun turrets. This provided a better and more stable foundation for fire-control equipment, greatly improved accommodation and protection from the weather.

General characteristics
The G3 battlecruisers were significantly larger than their predecessors of the Admiral class.

Propulsion
The G3 battlecruisers would have had four geared steam turbine sets, each of which drove one propeller shaft. They were arranged in three engine rooms. The forward engine room held the two turbines for the wing shafts, the middle compartment housed the turbine for the port inner shaft and the aft engine room contained the turbine for the starboard inner shaft. The turbines were powered by 20 Yarrow small-tube boilers divided between nine boiler rooms. Maximum speed would have been .

They had six turbo-driven  dynamos and two  diesel generators.

Armament
Housing the main armament in triple turrets was new to the Royal Navy though British companies had been involved in the production of triple gun turret designs for other navies. The choice of a high muzzle velocity with a relatively lighter shell was taken from the German practice; it ran counter to previous British guns such as the BL 15-inch Mark I gun of 42-calibre length which were lower-muzzle-velocity weapons firing heavy shells.

The G3 design mounted nine BL 16-inch Mark I 45-calibre guns in three triple hydraulically powered Mark I gun turrets, designated 'A', 'B', and 'X' from front to rear. The guns could be depressed to −3° and elevated to 40°. The ships' maximum stowage was 116 shells per gun. Four turrets were sited around the forward superstructure and four at the stern. The forward turrets were provided with 150 rounds per gun and the rear turrets with 110 rounds per gun. The guns could elevate between –5° and +60°. Their rate of fire was five rounds per minute.

An anti-aircraft battery of six QF 4.7-inch Mark VIII guns was included. They had a maximum depression of -5° and a maximum elevation of 90°. A maximum of 256 rounds per gun could be carried. The ships were intended to carry four 8-barreled mountings for the  QF 2-pounder Mark VIII gun (commonly known as a pom-pom), two abaft the funnels and two at the stern. Each barrel was provided with 1300 rounds of ammunition. The gun's rate of fire was approximately 96–98 rounds per minute.

Like previous classes of British battlecruisers, a pair of submerged, broadside-firing torpedo tubes were planned for these ships. Their compartment was located just forward of the 'A' shell room on the platform deck. Six  torpedoes per tube were to be carried in peacetime, but this would increase to eight in wartime.

Fire-control
The main guns of the G3 battlecruisers could be controlled from any of the three director-control towers (DCT). The primary DCT was mounted at the top of the forward superstructure. Another was mounted on the roof of the conning tower in an armoured hood and the third was aft. Each main gun turret was provided with a  coincidence rangefinder in an armoured housing on the turret roof. The secondary armament was primarily controlled by three DCTs. Two mounted on each side of the bridge and the third was aft. The anti-aircraft guns were controlled by a high-angle control system mounted on the very top of the forward superstructure. Each pom-pom mount had its own director and there was also a height-finder aft. Two  torpedo rangefinders were located on the sides of the funnels.

Armour
A first for any British dreadnought was the use of the all or nothing protection scheme in the G3s. Medium-thickness armour had proven to be useless in stopping heavy-calibre shells during World War I so the vital areas of the ship were protected by the thickest possible armour and the rest of the ship was left unarmoured. However, this system of protection required that the armoured citadel should have enough reserve buoyancy to keep the ship stable even if the rest of the hull was riddled by gunfire.

This angle increased the armor's relative thickness to horizontal, close-range fire, albeit at the cost of reducing its relative height which increased the chance of plunging shellfire going over or under it. The lower edge of the belt abreast the magazines was continued down another  by a  thickness of high-tensile steel inclined at 36° to prevent a shell from reaching the magazines via a wave trough at high speed. The forward and rear ends of the belt terminated in 12-inch and  transverse bulkheads respectively.

The box narrowed at an angle of 21° as it rose and had a maximum thickness of 12 inches nearest to the magazine. The armoured deck matched the length of the waterline belt and sloped down 2.5° to meet the upper edge of the belt. The deck's thickness increased to   partway over the rear engine room and covered the aft 6-inch magazines. The armoured deck extended forward 46 feet over the torpedo compartment with a maximum thickness of 8 inches, thinning to 6 inches.

The conning tower armour was 9 to 12 inches thick and its communications tube to the upper deck was 8 inches thick. The fire-control director atop the conning tower was protected by an armoured hood 3 to 5 inches thick.

The anti-torpedo bulges of the G3 battlecruisers were intended to withstand the explosion of a  torpedo warhead. The bulkhead was situated some  inboard from the side of the ship. A compressed air system was fitted to blow the water out of the buoyancy spaces and bring the ship upright in 15 minutes after two torpedo hits.

Orders and cancellation
At the end of the tendering process, the four G3 battlecruisers were ordered on 24 October 1921, without names, from John Brown, Swan Hunter, William Beardmore and Fairfield. Following the visit of an Admiralty delegation, detailed constructional drawings were sent to John Brown on 3 November with a request that copies be urgently circulated to the other successful contractors. Work at John Brown progressed on the keel blocks and hull plates for the subsequent two weeks. Notwithstanding other events, instructions and amendments continued to arrive from various departments within the Admiralty until 25 November.

The Washington Naval Conference on  arms limitation between the five leading naval powers which began negotiations on 11 November 1921, led to the suspension of building on 18 November. As no photographic evidence is available to show the ships' keels were actually laid down, it is asserted by at least one historian that none were, although the Admiralty paid John Brown for work and materials which would have been incurred in doing so.

Many of the aspects of their design ultimately were incorporated into the two s, and they are often described as being a cut-down G3. The Nelsons received the design designation 'O3', marking them as next in the design sequence from the 'N3' battleship design although they used the guns intended for the G3 class for cost reasons and to comply with the Treaty's 16-inch limitation on main armament.

See also

  – a contemporary U.S. design also cancelled as a result of the Washington Treaty
  – a series of four battlecruisers planned for the Imperial Japanese Navy as part of their "Eight-eight fleet", cancelled as a result of the Washington Treaty

Notes

Bibliography

 
 
 
 
 
 
 

Abandoned military projects of the United Kingdom
Battlecruisers of the Royal Navy
Cancelled ships
 
Proposed ships of the Royal Navy
Ship classes of the Royal Navy